Grand Theft Auto IV: The Lost and Damned is the first of two episodic expansion packs of the 2008 video game Grand Theft Auto IV, developed by Rockstar North and published by Rockstar Games. The game was released individually for the Xbox 360 on 17 February 2009, and as part of the disc-based package Grand Theft Auto: Episodes from Liberty City for PlayStation 3 and Microsoft Windows on 13 April 2010. The package also includes the second Grand Theft Auto IV expansion, The Ballad of Gay Tony, and does not require the base game to be played. Microsoft added Episodes from Liberty City to its backwards compatibility list for Xbox One platforms in February 2017.

Set concurrently with the events of Grand Theft Auto IV and The Ballad of Gay Tony, The Lost and Damned follows the exploits of Johnny Klebitz, vice-president of the Liberty City chapter of The Lost MC, a motorcycle club which, along with himself, feature in a number of missions in both games. The main storyline of the episode focuses on Johnny's efforts to keep the chapter running, while dealing with internal conflicts, gang warfare, drug running, and various enemies. It also shows Johnny's perspective in the diamond storyline depicted in both Grand Theft Auto IV and The Ballad of Gay Tony.

The game received highly positive reviews upon release, and is retrospectively considered to be among the best downloadable content packs on record.

Gameplay 
Grand Theft Auto IV: The Lost and Damned is an action-adventure game set in an open world environment and played from a third-person perspective. It features similar gameplay to that of Grand Theft Auto IV, and takes place in the same setting of Liberty City, the game only features around a third of the number of missions from that game, as was stated in an interview between IGN and the president of Rockstar North, which thus places the amount of time to complete it at  approximately 10–15 hours, depending on how focused the player is on the storyline. The game also features new additions, some in regard to Johnny's connection to the Lost MC, and some minor changes.

The most prominent of these additions is the availability of mid-mission checkpoints, which can spare the player repeated trips to a given location in order to trigger and replay a failed mission again — an often criticised aspect of the Grand Theft Auto series. Checkpoints are only available by retrying the mission after it has been previously failed — going to the mission start point begins the mission from scratch. Alongside the checkpoint system, The Lost and Damned features the inclusion of new weapons and vehicles, including Johnny's custom-made motorcycle (Johnny himself is more proficient with any bike than with any other vehicle), the ability to call on aid from members of the Lost MC, a new but small collection of random characters, additional side activities, and unique side jobs including Gang Wars and Bike Races. In addition, the game has a few changes to that of Grand Theft Auto IV, in that Johnny can access the whole of Liberty City from the start of a new game, but cannot change his clothing or enter clothing stores. The city's comedy club, Split Sides, also features a brand new comedian doing routines there, while gun stores do not stock any of the new weapons featured in The Lost and Damned; they can only be bought through the club's gun vendor.

Two of the new side jobs featured in The Lost and Damned – Gang Wars and Bike Races – require Johnny to be on a bike to trigger them. In Gang Wars, Johnny battles against rival gangs in a few variations – taking them out at a hangout, or while cruising the streets, or destroying a vehicle they are escorting – earning money from each war completed and unlocking a weapon at the Lost clubhouse (and a safehouse acquired later in the story) with every 10 subsequent wars completed. Each gang war becomes tougher, the more Johnny continues engaging in them. Meanwhile, Bike Races play out like the Street Races of Grand Theft Auto IV, except both Johnny and his opponents carry a baseball bat to attack their rival racers while making their way to each checkpoint of the race, with each capable of dislodging a racer from their bike depending on the strength of their swing. Other side jobs see Johnny either stealing bikes or working for a congressman met during the game's story. Meanwhile, the new additions to the activities from Grand Theft Auto IV, include Arm Wrestling (which differs in difficulties and wagers between various spots), games of Hi-Lo cards, and Air Hockey (found at the city's Bowling Alleys). The new weapons featured in the game includes the sawn-off shotgun, assault shotgun, pool cues, grenade launchers and pipe bombs.

Because of Johnny's position in the Lost MC, some missions and Gang Wars can see him accompanied by a team of bikers who, if they survive through either, can improve and gain experience and thus become more battle-hardened in later missions/Gang Wars. If, at any time, a biker is killed in a mission or gang war, they will be replaced by another in the next. Johnny can receive further support from two members of the Lost – Terry and Clay; both can be taken out for friend activities, but have their special abilities active from the beginning of a new game. If Terry is called, he will drive to a location near to Johnny and sell him weapons and armour, while Clay can deliver a bike of the player's choice to him directly. At a later stage in the game, Johnny can call one or the other, while on a mission, to gain back-up from them, with both capable of gaining experience that increases their health, combat abilities, and grant them better weapons.

While the single player has new additions, multiplayer is also given new modes, connected to the Lost MC, some of which improve on those featured in Grand Theft Auto IV:
 Witness Protection – One team is The Lost biker gang and they must try to eliminate a bus carrying witnesses while the other team is NOOSE who try to protect the bus as it delivers the witnesses to police stations around Liberty City.
 Races – Racing on bikes with racers carrying bats and smashing each other, similar to the video game Road Rash.
 Lone Wolf Biker – Free for all style mode where one player is the Lone Wolf and all other players must chase and kill that player to become the Lone Wolf. At the end of the game, whoever was the Lone Wolf for the longest time, wins.
 Own the City – Try to gain control of the city section by section, based on San Andreas' gang wars.
 Club Business – Like the original Mafia mode in GTA IV, but with a total of 8 players riding together as one gang. The player receives calls from Angus who tells you to carry out certain tasks for The Lost.
 Chopper vs. Chopper – Helicopter vs bike. Bike rider tries to get through checkpoints while the helicopter tries to stop the biker.

Synopsis

Setting 
The Lost and Damned takes place within the same setting used for Grand Theft Auto IV: the fictional U.S. metropolis of Liberty City (based on New York City) and the neighbouring state of Alderney (New Jersey). Unlike the base game, the entire map becomes available to explore after completing the expansion's first mission. The Lost and Damned's storyline occurs simultaneously with that of Grand Theft Auto IV and The Ballad of Gay Tony, and features returning characters and events; most notably, a side-story revolving around a shipment of stolen diamonds, which is depicted across all three games, from different perspectives.

Plot 
In 2008, Billy Grey (Lou Sumrall), president of the Lost outlaw motorcycle club's Alderney chapter, is welcomed back by his fellow gang members after his release from a court-ordered rehab. Although vice-president Johnny Klebitz (Scott Hill) is eager to resume business, Billy annoys him by breaking a truce Johnny had arranged with the Lost's rivals, the Angels of Death, during his absence. After a fellow gang member, Jason Michaels (Bill Burr), is killed in Broker, Billy blames his death on the Angels, despite the lack of concrete evidence, and orders the Lost to burn down their clubhouse in retaliation. When Johnny spots Billy and the Lost's secretary Brian Jeremy (Adrian Martinez) stealing a stash of heroin from the clubhouse after the attack, he questions the nature of Billy's orders. 

Billy later arranges for Johnny to oversee a deal with a potential buyer for the stolen heroin alongside Niko Bellic (Michael Hollick) and Playboy X (Postell Pringle), two associates of drug dealer Elizabeta Torres (Charlie Parker), who helped to set up the exchange. The deal is quickly revealed to be a police bust, but Johnny manages to escape with the drugs. During this time, Johnny also provides assistance to corrupt politician Thomas Stubbs III (John Lantz), who needs help with his re-election campaign and vows to return the favour in the future. Eventually, the Lost's treasurer and Johnny's best friend Jim Fitzgerald (Chris McKinney) arrives with news that the stolen heroin belonged to the Triads and advises the gang to return it to them. Billy agrees, but secretly arranges for the Triads to kill Johnny and Jim. When the Triads attack the pair during the exchange, they are forced to abandon the drugs and escape, while Billy is arrested by the police during the chaos. 

Johnny takes over as club president but faces new problems from Brian, who is still faithful to Billy and holds Johnny responsible for his arrest. While contending with a civil war started by Brian, Johnny struggles to raise money for the club. He takes on several jobs from Elizabeta alongside Malc (Walter Mudu) and DeSean (Craig "muMs" Grant), two members of the Uptown Riders outlaw motorcycle club, whom he quickly befriends. Johnny also helps his junkie ex-girlfriend Ashley Butler (Traci Godfrey) pay off her debts to Russian mobster Dimitri Rascalov by kidnapping Niko's cousin Roman (Jason Zumwalt). 

Eventually, Johnny kills Brian to end the war after learning where he is hiding from Pegorino Crime Family caporegime Ray Boccino (Joe Barbara), who often does deals with the Lost. In return for his help, Boccino asks the gang to steal a shipment of diamonds about to be purchased by nightclub owner "Gay" Tony Prince (David Kenner), and pass them onto Boccino's men to later retrieve. Although the theft is successful, the subsequent exchange with the Jewish mob, overseen by Johnny and Niko, is ambushed by Tony's bodyguard Luis Lopez (Mario D'Leon). During the chaos, Johnny escapes with Boccino's money, leading him to have both Johnny and Jim captured for their betrayal. The pair escape, but after Johnny deals with hitmen sent by Boccino, he learns from Ashley that Jim was killed shortly after they parted ways.

With the gang virtually weakened, Johnny receives a surprise visit from Stubbs with important news. Although Boccino is under observations by federal law enforcement and no longer poses a threat, Billy plans to exact his revenge on Johnny by turning state's evidence against the Lost, which will allow him to enter the Witness Protection Program. In response, Johnny leads the remaining Lost members in an attack on the Alderney State Correctional Facility to find and kill Billy. After executing Billy, Johnny and the survivors return to their clubhouse, only to find it vandalised by Boccino's men. The group decides to burn down the clubhouse's remains and find new pastures until they can start a new chapter of the Lost elsewhere. In the epilogue, Johnny firmly cuts his ties with Stubbs and Ashley, deciding to temporarily leave the gang to focus on financially supporting Jim's widow and child.

Soundtrack

Apart from the original Grand Theft Auto IV soundtrack, several new tracks were added to the radio stations in the expansion. LCHC - Liberty City Hardcore and Liberty Rock Radio saw the biggest addition of new tracks, to fit with the expansion's biker theme. LCHC also got the addition of a new radio show dedicated to extreme metal, hosted by Max Cavalera (ex-Sepultura, Soulfly and Cavalera Conspiracy).

Additional tracks were added to the rotation of The Beat 102.7 (with DJ Statik Selektah & Funkmaster Flex) and Radio Broker as well as a new radio show on the talk station WKTT; The Martin Serious Show (a parody of Shock jock style radio programs, in particular The Howard Stern Show).

Development
The content was first announced during Microsoft's 2006 E3 press conference on 9 May 2006. Peter Moore, then head of Microsoft's Interactive Entertainment Business division, described downloadable content as "epic episode packs", and not just an extra car or character. A press release during the conference said that the expansion packs, both The Lost and Damned and The Ballad of Gay Tony would add "hours of entirely new gameplay" to the game, with Jeronimo Barrera, Vice-President of Product Development for Rockstar Games, explaining that the episodes were experiments because they were not sure that there were enough users with access to online content on the Xbox 360. Take-Two Interactive's chief financial officer, Lainie Goldstein, revealed that Microsoft was paying a total of $50 million for the first two episodes.

On 20 February 2008, it was initially announced that the extra content would be introduced starting August 2008. Dan Houser, vice-president of creative development at Rockstar Games, claimed that through this episode, it would show "a different side of Liberty City". As part of its second quarter financial reports Take-Two announced that the downloadable content had been delayed and would be released during the first quarter of its 2009 financial year (November 2008–January 2009). On 13 November 2008, Take-Two executive chairman Strauss Zelnick warned that while they were aiming to release the first episode pack by January 2009, the date may have had to change to the second financial quarter of 2009 (February–April) depending on the completion date. 17 February's release date was eventually announced one week after Zelnick's warning.

Reception 

Grand Theft Auto IV: The Lost and Damned received "universal acclaim" for the Xbox 360 and "generally favorable" reviews for PlayStation 3 from critics, according to review aggregator Metacritic.

Critics cited its improved motorcycle mechanics in comparison to the previous games, dramatic storyline, quality voice acting, addictive multiplayer component and other new content which added many hours of game time. Complaints with the game have included auto-aiming issues and weak gang AI, which were a noticeable problem in the original game.

Controversy 
In the opening cutscene for the mission 'Politics', Tom Stubbs exposes his genitals in a full-frontal shot facing towards the camera after getting off a massage table and discussing his plans with Johnny. Parental advisory group Common Sense Media issued a public warning about the expansion pack due to a full-frontal male nudity scene during the cutscene. They claimed the game was "even more controversial than its predecessors" because it featured "full frontal male nudity".

Notes

References

External links
 

2009 video games
Action-adventure games
Episodic video games
Euphoria (software) games
Games for Windows certified games
Grand Theft Auto IV
Motorcycle video games
Multiplayer and single-player video games
Open-world video games
Organized crime video games
PlayStation 3 games
Rockstar Games games
Take-Two Interactive games
Video game downloadable content
Video game expansion packs
Video games about the illegal drug trade
Video games developed in the United Kingdom
Video games produced by Leslie Benzies
Video games set in 2008
Video games set in the United States
Video games written by Dan Houser
Windows games
Works about outlaw motorcycle clubs
Works about the Russian Mafia
Xbox 360 games